Javier Soria  (born 15 December 1974 in Lima) is a Peruvian former footballer who last played for Cobresol FBC.

Club career
Soria has played for a number of clubs in Peru, including Alianza Atlético and Sporting Cristal.

International career
Soria was selected for the Peru squad at Copa América 1999, but never made an appearance.

References

1974 births
Living people
People from Lima
Peruvian footballers
Sporting Cristal footballers
Cienciano footballers
Cobresol FBC footballers
Peruvian Primera División players
1999 Copa América players
Association football midfielders